Ololygon luizotavioi is a species of frogs in the family Hylidae.

It is endemic to Brazil.
Its natural habitats are subtropical or tropical moist lowland forests, subtropical or tropical moist montane forests, moist savanna, subtropical or tropical moist shrubland, subtropical or tropical dry lowland grassland, subtropical or tropical high-altitude grassland, rivers, freshwater marshes, intermittent freshwater marshes, pastureland, rural gardens, ponds, and canals and ditches.
It is threatened by habitat loss.

References

luizotavioi
Endemic fauna of Brazil
Frogs of South America
Amphibians described in 1989
Taxa named by Ulisses Caramaschi
Taxonomy articles created by Polbot